Ladysmith station is a former railway station in Ladysmith, British Columbia. It was a flag stop on Via Rail's Dayliner service, from 1979 to 2011. While the station's condition has deteriorated significantly since service was indefinitely suspended, volunteers continue to perform basic maintenance the station as of September 2019.

Footnotes

External links 
Via Rail Station Description

Via Rail stations in British Columbia
Disused railway stations in Canada